Petr Šabach (August 23, 1951 – September 16, 2017) was a Czech writer.

Works
 Jak potopit Austrálii (1986)
 Hovno hoří (1994)
 Zvláštní problém Františka S. (1996)
 Putování mořského koně (1998)
 Babičky (1998)
 Opilé banány (2001)
 Čtyři muži na vodě (2003)
 Ramon (2004)
 Občanský průkaz (2006)
 Tři vánoční povídky (2007)
 Škoda lásky (2009)

References

External links
 

Czech male writers
1951 births
2017 deaths
Writers from Prague
Charles University alumni